The Mississippi Valley Conference was an intercollegiate athletic conference that existed from 1928 to 1934. The league had members in the state of Tennessee.

Football champions

1928 – Murray State Normal
1929 – West Tennessee State
1930 – West Tennessee State

1931 – Tennessee Poly
1932 – Bethel (TN)

1933 – Bethel (TN)
1934 – Bethel (TN)

See also
List of defunct college football conferences

References

Defunct college sports conferences in the United States
College sports in Tennessee